Seiichi Kishi (August 3, 1867 – October 29, 1933) was the 2nd President of the Japanese Olympic Committee (1921–1933).

References
『若槻礼次郎自伝 古風庵回顧録　明治､大正､昭和政界秘史』　3-21頁
 現在のJR御茶ノ水駅近く聖橋の向かいにあり、2007年まで日立製作所本社があった。
 出典:1998年2月26日朝刊 朝日新聞

1867 births
1933 deaths
People from Shimane Prefecture
Members of the Japanese Olympic Committee
International Olympic Committee members